The Night Sitter is a 2018 American comedy horror film directed by Abiel Bruhn and John Rocco. It stars Elyse Dufour, Jack Champion, Jermaine Rivers, Amber Neukum, J. Benedict Larmore, Ben Barlow, Bailey Campbell, Joe Walz, Deanna Meske and Manny Sandow.

The film had its world premiere at the Kosmorama Trondheim International Film Festival on March 5, 2018. It was released on August 6, 2019, by Uncork’d Entertainment.

Plot
A scheming con artist poses as innocent babysitter “Amber” to steal from Ted Hooper, a wealthy occult enthusiast with a reclusive son named Kevin. Her crew arrives to clean out the house just as Kevin stumbles upon one of his father’s most prized artifacts and unwittingly summons a trio of witches known as The Three Mothers. As the playful, sadistic witches start picking people off, Amber and Kevin form an unlikely bond and try to survive the night together.

Cast
 Elyse Dufour as Amber
 Jack Champion as Kevin
 Jermaine Rivers as Rod
 Joe Walz as Ted Hooper
 Amber Neukum as Lindsey 
 Bailey Campbell as Ronnie
 Manny Sandow as Crispy
 J. Benedict Larmore as Martin	
 Ben Barlow as Vincent	
 Deanna Meske as Charlotte

Release
On February 13, 2019, it was announced that Uncork’d Entertainment had acquired the distribution rights for the film. The film was released digitally on August 6, 2019.

Reception
The Night Sitter has received positive reviews from critics. On the review aggregation website Rotten Tomatoes, the film holds  approval rating with an average rating of  based on  reviews.

References

External links

2018 films
2018 comedy horror films
Films shot in Tennessee
American comedy horror films
American independent films
2010s English-language films
2010s American films